The National Football League Coach of the Year Award is presented annually by various news and sports organizations to the National Football League (NFL) head coach who has done the most outstanding job of working with the talent he has at his disposal. Currently, the most widely recognized award is presented by the Associated Press (AP), although in the past several awards received press recognition. First presented in 1957, the AP award did not include American Football League (AFL) teams. The Sporting News has given a pro football coach of the year award since 1947 and in 1949 gave its award to a non-NFL coach, Paul Brown of the All-America Football Conference's Cleveland Browns. Other NFL Coach of the Year awards are presented by Pro Football Weekly/Pro Football Writers of America and the Maxwell Football Club. The United Press International (UPI) NFL Coach of the Year award was first presented in 1955. From 1960 to 1969, before the AFL–NFL merger, an award was also given to the most outstanding coach from the AFL. When the leagues merged in 1970, separate awards were given to the best coaches from the American Football Conference (AFC) and National Football Conference (NFC). The UPI discontinued the awards after 1996.

AP NFL Coach of the Year

Sporting News NFL Coach of the Year

Pro Football Weekly NFL Coach of the Year

Maxwell Football Club NFL Coach of the Year

Created in 1989 and presented by the Maxwell Football Club, the award is officially titled the Earle "Greasy" Neale Award for "Professional Coach of the Year".

Touchdown Club of Columbus NFL Coach of the Year
This award is officially called the Paul Brown Trophy.

Kansas City Committee of 101 AFC/NFC Coach of the Year Awards
See: Kansas City Committee of 101 Awards#Coach of the Year Awards (NFC and AFC) (since 1969)

UPI National Football League Coach of the Year

See also
 List of National Football League awards

References

National Football League trophies and awards
National Football League coaches
Coaching awards